Baseball IQ is an American television game show airing on the cable channel MLB Network. The show debuted on January 24, 2012, and its first season ended on February 23, 2012, with the season championship. The show is hosted by MLB Network anchor Matt Vasgersian. The show's focus is baseball trivia.

Format
The show features 32 contestants (each of whom works for one of the 30 Major League Baseball teams as well as one from MLB.com and one from the National Baseball Hall of Fame and Museum) in a bracket-style tournament for up to USD 45,000 for their teams' designated charities. Each episode's winner receives USD 5,000 for the charity and the season champion receives USD 25,000 for the charity. The season runner-up's charity receives USD 15,000.

Gameplay
The gameplay starts with the "Lead-off Home Run" question. The player who buzzes in gets the chance to answer. If the player is correct, they score the first run and control of a board with 8 categories to be used in the first 8 rounds ("innings"8 or 9 "innings" per episode). If the player who buzzes in is incorrect, their opponent gets the first run and control of the board. For the first 8 innings, the player in control picks a category and the subject of a list-based question is given. Players alternate giving answers in the category until one either gives an incorrect answer, repeats a previously given answer, or runs out of time trying to come up with an answer. At that point, the other player wins the inning and is given the option to use their one "Big Inning" (each player in each episode gets one) and gives four more answers to earn 2 runs. However if the player uses their Big Inning and fails to get 4 correct answers, he loses the amount of runs he was awarded in the inning. The number of runs for winning the inning outright is determined by how deep the players went in the inning. After 8 innings, if one player is ahead of his opponent by more runs than can be scored in the ninth inning, the "mercy rule" goes into effect and no ninth inning is played.

In the ninth inning, the two players would bid on the number of correct answers they can give in the final category. If the player who wins the bidding gives the number of correct answers that they bid would score the runs and, if they bid enough, would win the game. If the ninth inning ends in a tie, one more buzz-in question is asked. If the player who buzzes in gets the answer correct, they get the run, win the game, and advance in the tournament. The other player scores and wins if the buzz-in player answers incorrectly.

The first tournament was won by Shane Demmitt, representing the Los Angeles Angels of Anaheim, who defeated Ben Baumer, representing the New York Mets, in the final round.

Contestants

External links
Official website with most recently updated bracket

MLB Network original programming
2012 American television series debuts
2010s American game shows